Bennett Run is a tributary of the Beaver River in western Pennsylvania.  The stream rises in north-central Beaver County then flows southwest entering the Beaver River at Morado, Pennsylvania. The watershed is roughly 25% agricultural, 53% forested and the rest is other uses.

See also
List of rivers of Pennsylvania

References

Rivers of Pennsylvania
Tributaries of the Beaver River
Rivers of Beaver County, Pennsylvania
Allegheny Plateau